Abraxas incolorata is a species of moth belonging to the family Geometridae. It was described by Warren in 1894. It is known from Java.

References

Abraxini
Moths of Indonesia
Moths described in 1894